"Little Armalite", also known as "My Little Armalite" or "Me Little Armalite" is an Irish Republican song that praises Armalite rifles that were used by republican paramilitaries against British security forces in Northern Ireland during the Troubles. One recording of the song, by Wolfhound, was released on 7" in 1975.

Background

The song dates from the early 1970s, when the Provisional Irish Republican Army (IRA) secretly imported modern weaponry, most notably Armalite rifles, from the United States. The Armalite can refer to a version of the AR-15 (M16) rifle made specifically by the Armalite Corporation or to the Armalite AR-18, a slightly later, gas piston operated, 5.56mm rifle. Both weapons have been used by the IRA in its armed campaign, however, the song originally referred to the Armalite AR-180 semi-automatic rifle that was available to civilians in the United States at the time.

The song, set to the tune of the traditional song "Home, Boys, Home", places the narrator at first in a disadvantaged position, he is beaten and insulted by a British soldier. However, when he obtains his rifle, he is able to fight back against the British Army and the Royal Ulster Constabulary (RUC), even when they are equipped with Saracen, Saladin and Ferret armoured cars. Each chorus celebrates Provisional IRA ("Provos") actions and references different republican strongholds. Firstly the Falls Road and Kilwilkie in Lurgan, (although in many versions this is swapped with a more well known Republican area), then the Bogside area of Derry and Bellaghy in southern County Free Derry and Crossmaglen in South Armagh.

Lyrics
And it's down Along the Falls Road, that's where I long to be,
Lying in the dark with a Provo company,
A comrade on my left and another on my right
And a clip of ammunition for my little Armalite.

I was stopped by a soldier, said he, You are a swine,
He hit me with his rifle and he kicked me in the groin,
I begged and I pleaded, sure me manners were polite
But all the time I'm thinking of me little Armalite.

And it's down in The Bogside that's where I long to be,
Lying in the dark with a Provo company,
A comrade on my left and another on my right
And a clip of ammunition for my little Armalite.

Sure a brave RUC man came marching up into our street
Six hundred British soldiers he had lined up at his feet 
"Come out, ye cowardly Fenians", said he, "come out and fight".
But he cried, "I'm only joking", when he heard the Armalite.

Sure it's down in Kilwilkie, that's where I long to be,
Lying in the dark with a Provo company,
A comrade on my left and another on my right
And a clip of ammunition for my little Armalite.

Sure, the army came to visit me, 'twas in the early hours,
With Saladins and Saracens and Ferret armoured cars
They thought they had me cornered, but I gave them all a fright
With the armour piercing bullets of my little Armalite.

And it's down in the New Lodge that's where I long to be,
Lying in the dark with a Provo company,
A comrade on me left and another on me right
And a clip of ammunition for my little Armalite.

When Tuzo came to Belfast, he said, The battle's won,
Said General Ford, We're winning sir, we have them on the run.
But corporals and privates on patrol at night,
Said, Send for reinforcements, it's the bloody Armalite.

And it's down in Crossmaglen, that's where I long to be,
Lying in the dark with a Provo company,
A comrade on me left and another on me right
And a clip of ammunition for my little Armalite.

Notes

References

External links
 Video with song and music

1970s songs
Irish songs
Year of song missing
1975 singles
Songs about The Troubles (Northern Ireland)